Crescent Beach  is a community in the Canadian province of Nova Scotia, located in the Lunenburg Municipal District in Lunenburg County.  The community gets its name from the nearby beach of the same name.  See Crescent Beach.

References
Crescent Beach on Destination Nova Scotia

Communities in Lunenburg County, Nova Scotia
General Service Areas in Nova Scotia